The Obukhov length is used to describe the effects of buoyancy on turbulent flows, particularly in the lower tenth of the atmospheric boundary layer.  It was first defined by Alexander Obukhov in 1946. It is also known as the Monin–Obukhov length because of its important role in the similarity theory developed by Monin and Obukhov. A simple definition of the Monin-Obukhov length is that height at which turbulence is generated more by buoyancy than by wind shear.

The Obukhov length is defined by

where  is the frictional velocity,  is the mean virtual potential temperature,  is the surface virtual potential temperature flux, k is the von Kármán constant. The virtual potential temperature flux is given by

By this definition,  is usually negative in the daytime since  is typically positive during the daytime over land, positive at night when  is typically negative, and becomes infinite at dawn and dusk when  passes through zero.

During the day  is the height at which the buoyant production of turbulence kinetic energy (TKE) is equal to that produced by the shearing action of the wind (shear production of TKE).

References

Atmospheric dispersion modeling
Boundary layer meteorology
Fluid dynamics
Buoyancy
Meteorology in the Soviet Union
Microscale meteorology